Glucose-6-phosphate exchanger SLC37A4, also known as glucose-6-phosphate translocase, is an enzyme that in humans is encoded by the SLC37A4 gene.

See also
 Solute carrier family

References

Further reading

Solute carrier family